Ross Sutherland RFC is a rugby union club based in Invergordon, in Easter Ross in the Highlands of Scotland.
 
The club also runs a number of junior sides and has a well-established mini rugby section for Primary school children.

History 

As rugby made its way north it took hold in Inverness in the early 1920s. Shortly afterwards a Ross and Sutherland contingent broke away to form Ross Sutherland RFC. Records begin in 1927 although the club may have been running a few years earlier. The club spent some time in Dingwall and Strathpeffer before coming to the Naval Grounds in Invergordon where they have one of the finest pitches in the north of Scotland and excellent facilities.  The club's most famous player were Duncan Macrae who played for Scotland and the British Lions on the 1938 tour of South Africa. Ross Sutherland nominates players to represent the club at regional level as part of the SRU pathway programme yearly.

In 2017/18 Ross Sutherland won the National bowl at Murrayfield Stadium. After previously winning the Caledonian Regional Bowl.

Notable players

North and Midlands

The following former Madras College F.P. players have represented North and Midlands at provincial level.

References

External links
 Club website

Scottish rugby union teams
Invergordon
Rugby union in Highland
Rugby clubs established in 1927
1927 establishments in Scotland
Sport in Sutherland